Johann Georg Heinrich Feder (15 May 1740 – 22 May 1821) was a German philosopher.

Life
Feder was born on 15 May 1740 in the village of Schornweisach (now a part of Uehlfeld, Bavaria) in the Principality of Bayreuth, the son of Martin Heinrich Feder († 1749), the village pastor. Feder studied theology and pedagogy at Erlangen. From 1768 to 1782 he was Professor of Philosophy at the University of Göttingen. At the time of his death, in Hanover, he was Director of the Pageninstitut.

His writings were widely read at the time due to their clear and tasteful mode of presentation. Feder decisively countered Immanuel Kant's idealism. He gained notoriety through his abbreviation of Christian Garve's review of Kant's Critique of Pure Reason. As philosopher Feder belonged to the better representatives of the eclectics tending towards the Leibniz–Wolff School.

Works
 Sex dies, intra quos opus creationis absolutum, quales fuerint (1759).
 Homo natura non ferus (1765).
 Grundriss der philosophischen Wissenschaften (1767). 2nd ed., 1769.
 Vom Werthe des systematischen Denkens (1767).
 Der neue Emil (1768–1774). 2 volumes.
 Volume 1, 1768. 2nd ed., 1771. 3rd ed., 1774.
 Volume 2, 1774.
 Logik und Metaphysik im Grundriss (1769). 3rd ed., 1783. Google (UMich)
 Lehrbuch der praktischen Philosophie (1770).
 Institutiones logicae et metaphysicae (1777).
 Untersuchungen über den menschlichen Willen (1779–1793). 4 volumes.
 Volume 1, 1779.
 Volume 2, 1782.
 Volume 3, 1786.
 Volume 4, 1793.
 Grundlehren zur Kenntniß des menschlichen Willens (1783). 2nd ed., 1785. Google (Lausanne)
 Ueber Raum und Causalität, zur Prüfung der kantischen Philosophie (1787). 
 (ed.) Philosophische Bibliothek (1788–1791). 4 volumes.
 Grundsätze der Logik und Metaphysik (1794).
 Sophie Churfürstin von Hannover im Umriss (1810).
 Handbuch über das Staats- Rechnungs- und Kassen-Wesen (1820). Google (UMich)
 Feders Leben, Natur und Grundsätze (1825). [Feder's autobiography, edited by his son Karl August Ludwig]

External links
 Biography in Allgemeine Deutsche Biographie, Vol. 6, 1877, pp. 595–597. 

1740 births
1821 deaths
People from Neustadt (Aisch)-Bad Windsheim
18th-century German philosophers
19th-century German philosophers
Enlightenment philosophers
People from the Principality of Bayreuth
University of Erlangen-Nuremberg alumni
Academic staff of the University of Göttingen
18th-century German male writers